Zabasearch.com is a website that searches for and collates disparate information regarding United States residents, including names, current and past addresses, phone numbers, and birth years, and then permits the user to query other search engines with this information to retrieve additional data, such as satellite photos of addresses and criminal background checks.

History
ZabaSearch was founded by Nick Matzorkis and Robert Zakari  The website allows free searches for certain information, but requests for further information are directed to Intelius. Premium services, accessible by registering an email address and password at the site, or by signing in via Facebook, entitle users to run a free Zabasearch background check or to search by phone number. After a trial period, premium services are accessible via a monthly fee.

Zabasearch was acquired by Intelius in December 2008.
 
Zabasearch claims it overtook Yahoo! People Search as the highest-trafficked people search engine by May 2005.

Description
Irene Davids, in an article posted at KillerStartups.com, describes Zabasearch thusly: 
Do you have a cousin that you haven’t seen for years and would like to know where to reach him? Maybe you would like to start stalking your favorite celebrity? Then go to Zabasearch, considered google on steroids, this site provides you with a free and easy to use search bar, where you can type anybody’s name, that is, anybody that lives in the United States, and their address and phone numbers will appear. A recent search for a certain Hollywood and indie film star who shall remain nameless (let’s avoid stalkers, ok?) fielded results showing she owned a house in the Hollywood Hills and an apartment in Greenwich Village in NYC.

As SFGates David Lazarus further discussed in 2005, regarding the site's free and paid services:

ZabaSearch buys and gives away basic personal data as a loss leader to induce visitors to purchase more comprehensive background checks for $20 each.

The company charges $100 for even more in-depth searches, with a money- back guarantee if the person sought doesn't turn up.

It also carries a paid link to Experian, the credit-reporting agency, to obtain a free credit report. (This will automatically sign you up as well for Experian's credit-monitoring program, which will cost $9.95 a month unless you opt out after a 30-day trial period.)

The company asserts that all of the information accessible on the site was already extant on the Internet on many government or corporate databases, the likes of which could (usually) already be accessed piecemeal by the general public.  As such, they assert that the site fosters nothing new except the convenience of gathering the data automatically and is not suited for use by potential identity thieves.

The website, which may be searched online as well as accessed on the Google Toolbar,  allows consumers who register there the option to be notified by email when they, or people they know, are being searched and advised who is searching their name or social security number.

Reception
Irene Davids' aforementioned review at KillerStartups.com hinted at the site's usefulness for stalking but skewed towards favorable, while Reviewopedia's balanced review of Zabasearch, metatitled "Zabasearch - Legit or Scam?", even-handedly enumerates the site's pros and cons. As of April 5, 2014, the two articles posted in the "Related Articles" section, positioned immediately below the Zabasearch review, are both cautionary, "People Search Websites and What You Should Know"  and "Protect Yourself from Online Identity Theft".

Email messages containing personal information that were previously not searchable by Google, Internet Explorer or FireFox became searchable sometime before June 2014, which many people may consider to be a violation of privacy. Zabasearch previously claimed to only share names and email addresses of users and information already published elsewhere, and not the text of personal messages.

However, numerous complaints about Zabasearch have been posted with various agencies - such as the Federal Trade Commission (FTC) regarding Internet privacy, the Privacy Rights Clearinghouse (PRC), and the California Office of Privacy Protection (COPP).

References

Further reading

External links

Online companies of the United States
Online person databases
Internet properties established in 2000